Bullfrog International, LC, founded in 1997, is a Utah-based company that designs and manufactures a high-end line of hot tubs with a branded feature called the JetPak Therapy System. Bullfrog International currently distributes products in the United States, Canada, Australia, New Zealand, South America, Asia and Europe.

In February 2011, Bullfrog International named Jerry Pasley, former Executive Vice President at Jacuzzi Hot Tubs and Sundance Spas, as CEO.

References

External links
 

Bathing
Manufacturing companies based in Utah
1997 establishments in Utah
Companies based in Salt Lake County, Utah